Jyotiba Rao Scindia (1726 - January 1760) was the third son of Ranoji Rao Scindia and Maina Bai. He was elder half brother of Mahadaji Scindia.

In 1742, the Marathas were attacked by the Nizam of Hyderabad at Berar and Belur. Jyotiba and Mahadaji, Both the Shinde Brothers along with only 1500 army under Sadashivrao Bhau’s army defeated Nizam.

References

See also
Scindia

Scindia dynasty of Gwalior
1726 births
1760 deaths